The Ahchipsou were a Sadz (Abkhaz-Abazin) tribe, that lived on Caucasus Major, near the modern border of Krasnodar Krai and Abkhazia. They lived at the upper Mzymta, and its inflow Achipse, modern Krasnaya Polyana, Adlersky City District, Sochi, Russia. The Ahchipsou were dominated by the clan of Kazılbeg Azaguyipa.

The Ahchipsou were conquered in May, 1864, showing the last resistance during the Russian-Circassian War. After the war they resettled into the Ottoman Empire (see Muhajirism).

References

History of Sochi
History of Abkhazia
Abkhaz diaspora